"Child Come Away" is a song by English singer Kim Wilde, released as a single on 4 October 1982.

Though its subject matter was dark, it was similar in sound to previous synth-driven successes like "Cambodia" and "View from a Bridge", and it was also an exclusive single release, unavailable on an album. It features Gary Barnacle on saxophone.

The single peaked at number 43 on the UK Singles Chart, while reaching the top 10 in Sweden and Switzerland.

Charts

References

1982 singles
1982 songs
Kim Wilde songs
RAK Records singles
Songs written by Marty Wilde
Songs written by Ricky Wilde